The Chung Cheng Aviation Museum was an aviation museum located at Taiwan Taoyuan International Airport in Dayuan Township, Taoyuan County (now Dayuan District, Taoyuan City), Taiwan. The museum closed on March 31, 2014, to allow for planned construction of Terminal 3 at Taiwan Taoyuan International Airport and for relocation of taxiway WC. Items displayed at the museum have been sent to storage and all 18 aircraft on display will be relocated to former Taoyuan Naval base during the second half of 2014.

The museum was located in the southeastern area of the airport between the main freeway entrance and the airport terminals. It was built in 1981 by Boeing under a Civil Aeronautics Administration contract.

Many retired Republic of China Air Force fighters are represented in the museum.

Aircraft

Grumman HU-16 Albatross
North American T-28 Trojan
Grumman S-2 Tracker
North American F-86 Sabre
Douglas DC-3
McDonnell F-101 Voodoo
North American F-100 Super Sabre
Lockheed F-104 Starfighter
Lockheed T-33 Shooting Star
Northrop F-5

See also

List of aerospace museums
List of museums in Taiwan

References

External links 

Chung Cheng Aviation Museum, Wikimapia
Chung Cheng Aviation Museum, Panoramio
MyAviation.net information

Museums established in 1981
Buildings and structures completed in 1981
Demolished buildings and structures in Taiwan
1981 establishments in Taiwan
2014 disestablishments in Taiwan
Buildings and structures demolished in 2014